Fort Clifton may refer to:
Fort Clifton (Kansas), a frontier fort in Kansas
Fort Clifton (Virginia), a Confederate fort in Colonial Heights, Virginia